Morgan Summit is a mountain pass on a road shared by Highway 89 and Highway 36 in Tehama County, California. The pass is located in between the town of Mineral and Childs Meadow south of Lassen Peak and Lassen Volcanic National Park. The pass is high enough to receive snowfall during the winter.

References

Mountain passes of California
Landforms of Tehama County, California